52872 Okyrhoe  is a centaur orbiting in the outer Solar System between Jupiter and Saturn. It was discovered on 19 September 1998, by the Spacewatch survey at Kitt Peak Observatory in Arizona, United States, and named after Ocyrhoe from Greek mythology.

Orbit and classification 
Centaurs have short dynamical lives due to strong interactions with the giant planets. Okyrhoe is estimated to have an orbital half-life of about 670 thousand years. Of objects listed as a centaur by the Minor Planet Center (MPC), JPL, and the Deep Ecliptic Survey (DES), Okyrhoe has the second smallest perihelion distance of a numbered centaur. Numbered centaur  has a smaller perihelion distance.

Naming 
It was named after Ocyrhoe, the daughter of Chiron and Chariclo from Greek mythology.

Physical characteristics

Sublimation 
Okyrhoe passed perihelion in early 2008, and exhibited significant magnitude variations during March and April 2008. This could be a sign of sublimation of volatiles.

See also

References

External links 
 

Centaurs (small Solar System bodies)
052872
Named minor planets
19980919